María Mencía is a Spanish-born media artist and researcher working as a Senior Lecturer at Kingston University in London, United Kingdom. Her artistic work is widely recognized in the field of electronic literature, and her scholarship on digital textuality has been widely published. She holds a Ph.D. in Digital Poetics and Digital Art at the Chelsea College of Arts of the University of the Arts London
and studied English Philology at the Complutense University of Madrid.

Mencía's work has been featured in galleries as installation art, presented at conferences and art festivals, published on the Internet, and included in various curated collections of electronic literature, such as The Electronic Literature Collection, Volume 1, an anthology available on the Internet and on compact disc, edited by N. Katherine Hayles, Nick Montfort,  Scott Rettberg, and Stephanie Strickland, and the Electronic Literature as a Model of Creativity and Innovation in Practice (ELMCIP) project funded by the Humanities in the European Research Area (HERA). In addition to earning recognition in the English-speaking world, Mencía’s work is frequently mentioned in Spanish media.

Critical reception
Literary critic and media scholar N. Katherine Hayles considers Mencía's work at the intersection of human and nonhuman through media transformation. Within the history of literacy, Hayles takes Mencía's work as an exploration of the disassociation of sound from a stable textual referent in a digital environment. Hayles thus sees Mencía's work as transcending electronic literature as a literary form to offer insight into the "media transformations and the conditions that make literacy possible." Media scholar Christopher Funkhouser, in tracing the evolution of digital poetry, has considered Mencía's work to be "inventing a new media language" through her innovative use of images and sound, much in the tradition of intermedia.

Mencía’s 2001 project ‘’Another Kind of Language’’ has been interpreted as a commentary on linguistic imperialism in the 21st century, juxtaposing and destabilizing Global English with Mandarin Chinese and Arabic. Hypermedia artist/writer Talan Memmott describes the project as an example of "signifying harmonics," and discusses the ways in which the project's transfer from installation piece to Web project diminishes the original auditory experience of the interweaving of the three languages.

Mencía’s Birds Singing Other Birds’ Songs, an interactive experience in which images of birds fly across the screen at the user's prompting, singing human-generated bird calls with the corresponding onomatopoeias written on the bird, has generated significant scholarly and popular attention. Media critic Scott Rettberg conceives of the project, with its abstract use of language, within the tradition of 20th century avant-garde movements, especially Dada sound poetry, rejecting what he sees as the common focus on novelty in electronic literature. Media scholar and archeologist Lori Emerson sees the project as a comment on the translation process, from bird to human languages and back. In her emphasis on electronic literature, Emerson criticizes Birds Singing Other Birds’ Songs for not taking full advantage of the digital medium as an essential component of the message of the piece. In contrast to Emerson, Hayles considers how the project plays with various forms of cognition via the creation of hybrid beings where the human and nonhuman come together to create a new way of knowing. Additionally, Hayles describes Birds as "a reenactment of the history of literacy" in its move from sound to writing to pictorial (digital) iconography. Mencía’s choice of birds as the subject of her work has even been interpreted within the long literary tradition of bird representations as a reflection on the distortion and recreation of orality and the transformation of iconography from human code (writing) into bird's code.

Selected artistic works

 Mencia discusses this work in Narrabase. This was also in the Electronic Literature Organization's Electronic Literature Collection volume 1.

Selected scholarly publications

References

Spanish artists
Year of birth missing (living people)
Living people
Spanish women artists
Electronic literature writers